Martin of Aragon may refer to:

Martin of Aragon (1356–1410), King of Aragon and Sicily
Martin I of Sicily (1374/75/76–1409), King of Sicily and Crown Prince of Aragon
Martin of Aragon, Heir of Sicily (1406–1407), Crown Prince of Sicily